Ayelén García (born 13 December 1999) is an Argentine handball player for River Plate and the Argentine national team.

Awards
2016 Pan American Women's Youth Handball Championship: All star team Right wing

References

Argentine female handball players
1999 births
Living people
21st-century Argentine women